The musée d'art et d'histoire (Museum of Art and History) is a museum in Neuchâtel, Switzerland. Among its exhibits are the Jaquet-Droz automata. The collections of paintings include works of Claude Monet, Camille Pissarro, and Pierre-Auguste Renoir.

The museum's stairwell features three monumental murals painted by Léo-Paul Robert between 1886 and 1894.

References

External links
 The official site.

Art museums and galleries in Switzerland
Museums in the canton of Neuchâtel